Evgeniy Chernyak is a businessman is the head of the supervisory board of the holding Global Spirits (the biggest alcohol holding in Eastern Europe) and owner of the brand Khortytsia. He holds the 19th place on the Ukrainian Forbes TOP-100.

Biography
Chernyak began his career as General Director in Trade House Megalopolis in 1998. In 2002, he was elected as the permanent head of the founding board of Trade House Megalopolis. He has been serving as the Chairman of the Supervisory Board of Global Spirits since 2010. 

In the early 2010s, the businessman moved to the United States (first to Miami, later to New York) and was actively involved in business development in North America with his new vodka brand KHOR. Evgeny Chernyak explained his desire to develop business in the American market by more stable markets, higher margins and fair rules.

In 2018, Evgeny Chernyak started his own YouTube channel (Big Money), in which he interviews famous businessmen and media personalities of the post-Soviet countries. As of July 2022, Evgeniy Chernyak’s channel has about 870 thousand subscribers. He also runs paid lectures of the same name held in the cities of Ukraine, and has published 2 books.

He is one of the five largest benefactors of Ukraine as the Founder and President of the charity foundation "Patriot Zaporizhzhia".

Fortune

As of 2021, Evgeny Chernyak is listed in the TOP-20 of Forbes Ukraine. ($470 million). Chernyak's estimated net worth is based on his earnings in the Ukrainian market which is around 25% of Global Spirits annual turnaround.

References

External links

 Evgeny Chernyak official website
 Article on Ekonomiczna Pravda 

1969 births
Living people
Businesspeople from Zaporizhzhia
Zaporizhzhya National Technical University alumni
Interregional Academy of Personnel Management alumni
Soviet Army personnel
Businesspeople in the drink industry
Ukrainian food industry businesspeople